Hasmonean coinage are the coins minted by the Hasmonean kings. Only bronze coins in various denominations have been found; the smallest being a prutah or a half prutah. Two Roman silver denarii are associated with the Hasmoneans; one has the inscription BACCIVS IVDAEAS; with its exact meaning unclear (short for "BASILEOS IUDAEAS", King Judas?). Both show a man thought to be Yehuda Aristobolus bowing before a camel with a palm branch in his hand. 

The Hebrew inscriptions found on Hasmonean coins are:

"Yehochanan Kohen Gadol Chever Hayehudim" (Yehochanan the High Priest, Council of the Jews).
"Yehochanan Kohen Gadol Rosh Chever Hayehudim" (Yehochanan the High Priest, Head of the Council of the Jews).
"Yehonatan Kohen Gadol Chever Hayehudim" (Yehonatan the High Priest, Council of the Jews).
"Yehonatan Hamelech" (Yehonatan the King).
"Yehudah Kohen Gadol Chever Hayehudim" (Yehudah the High Priest, Council of the Jews).
"Malka Aleksandros" (King Alexander)
"Matityahu Kohen Gadol Chever Hayehudim" (Matityahu the High Priest, Council of the Jews).
"Matityahu HaKohen" (Matityahu the High Priest).
"Mattityah"

The Hasmonean dynasty and era (164–37 BCE)
The era of Hashmonean rule lasted for 103 years. It was founded by High Priest Simon son of Matityahu, and consolidated by his son Yochanan surnamed Hyrcanus. Thereafter followed Yehuda Aristobolus, Salome Alexandra, Alexander Yannai and then feuding brothers Hyrcanus II and Aristobulus. Hyrcanus and Aristoblulus each asked the Roman Republic to intervene on their behalf; as a result Judea fell under the greater rule of Rome as an autonomous province but still with a significant amount of autonomy. The last Hashmonean king was Aristobulus's son Matityahu Antigonus.

In 138BCE the Seleucid King Antiochus VII Sidetes published a royal decree, granting Simon Maccabaeus the right to mint his own coinage.

John Hyrcanus
John Hyrcanus (in Hebrew Yochanan Hyrcanus; reigned 134–104 BCE, until his death). Minted prutot that said:
Yehochanan the High Priest and council of the Jews (Sanhedrin)
Yehochanan the High Priest and the head of council of the Jews
Yehochanan the High Priest and the [council of the] Jews
'A' (may have stood for Antiochus VII) Yehochanan the High Priest and council of the Jews
He also had monograms on some prutot on the cornucopia side, just left of the cornucopia, some resembling Ά, Π or Λ.

Alexander Jannaeus
Alexander Jannaeus (also known as Alexander Jannai/Yannai), king of Judea from (103 to 76 BCE), son of John Hyrcanus, inherited the throne from his brother Aristobulus, and married his brother's widow, Shlomtzion or "Shelomit".

The Jannaeus coins are the most typical Jewish coins found at archeological sites in the former lands of the Hasmonean kingdom. They represent over 87% of the coins discovered in Jerusalem and 39% of the Hasmonean, Herodian, and Byzantine coins found in the southern Levant. Gamla was the site of the largest-ever discovery of Jannaeus coins from a single location.

Matityahu Antigonus
Antigonus the Hasmonean (also known as Matityahu Antigonus) was the son of King Aristobulus II of Judea.

Obv: Menorah with Greek inscription "BASILEWS ANTIGONOY" (King Antignus).
Rev: Showbread Table (Shulchan) with Hebrew inscription "Matityahu HaKohen" (Matityahu the High Priest).

Obv: Double cornucopia with ancient Hebrew script; reading "Matityahu Kohen Gadol Chever Hayehudim" (Matityahu the High Priest, Council of the Jews).
Rev: Greek inscription; reading "BASILEWS ANTIGONOY" (King Antignus).

See also

List of historical currencies
List of artifacts significant to the Bible
Zuz
Shekel
Hasmonean
Maccabees
Maccabean Revolt
Judah Maccabeus
Jonathan Maccabaeus
Simon Maccabeus
Mattathias
Alexander Jannaeus
John Hyrcanus
Aristobulus
Salome Alexandra
Hyrcanus II
Aristobulus II

References

External links
 List of all Ancient Hebrew and Aramaic words from Jewish coins and their meanings.. (Judaea Coin Archive)

currency
Ancient currencies
Coins of Judea